This is an episode list of the British sitcom Blackadder. Dates shown are original airdates on BBC One.

Series overview

Episodes

Unaired pilot

Series 1: The Black Adder (1983)

The episodes in this series were originally shown on BBC One on Wednesday evenings, 21:25 – 22:00. Note: The "Ultimate Edition" DVD retains the broadcast order, which switched the second and fourth episodes as "Born to Be King" was not ready for transmission, despite on-screen dates continuing to identify the true order as "Born to Be King", "The Archbishop", "The Queen of Spain's Beard"

Series 2: Blackadder II (1986)

The episodes in this series were originally shown on BBC One on Thursday evenings, 21:30 – 22:00. The episode titles are single word references to the theme of the episode: a wedding, executions, voyages of exploration, debt, drinking alcohol, and imprisonment, respectively.

Series 3: Blackadder the Third (1987)

The episodes in this series were originally shown on BBC One on Thursday evenings, 21:30 – 22:00. The episode titles use alliteration in parody of the titles of Jane Austen's novels Sense and Sensibility and Pride and Prejudice.

Series 4: Blackadder Goes Forth (1989)

The episodes in this series were originally shown on BBC One on Thursday evenings, 21:30 – 22:00. The episode titles are, with exception of the final episode, puns on military ranks.

Specials

Additional appearances

References

External links
 Blackadder Hall – The Series
 Episode Guides

Blackadder
List of
Blackadder episodes